Donja Gorevnica is a village in the municipality of Čačak, Serbia. According to the 2011 census, the village has a population of 877 people.

Notable people
Jovan Kursula (1768–1813), Serbian revolutionary.
Obren Pjevović (1919-1991), Serbian composer.

References

Sources

Populated places in Moravica District